Alice Dwyer (born Alice Deekeling; 1988) is a German actress.

Dwyer uses the last name of her New Zealand born mother, Angela Dwyer, as a stage name. She has been married to actor  since 2018.

Selected filmography

References

External links 

 Agenturseite von Alice Dwyer (in German)
 Alice Dwyer on RTV (in German)

1988 births
Living people
German film actresses
Actresses from Berlin
German child actresses
German people of New Zealand descent